Agyneta curvata is a species of sheet weaver found in Kenya. It was described by Bosmans in 1979.

References 

Endemic fauna of Kenya
curvata
Invertebrates of Kenya
Spiders of Africa
Spiders described in 1979